The Slovenian Sportsperson of the Year is an annual award presented by the Association of Slovenian Sports Journalists for the best sportsman and sportswoman of the previous year. The first awards ceremony was held in 1968.

Winners

Multiple winners

See also
Slovenian Athletes Hall of Fame

References
General

Specific

External links
Association of Slovenian Sports Journalists official website

Slovenian sportspeople
National sportsperson-of-the-year trophies and awards
Slovenian awards
Awards established in 1968
1968 establishments in Slovenia